John James Jackson (born 11 April 1977) is a former British bobsleigher and Royal Marines commando.

Career
He took up bobsleighing at the age of 28 and in September 2005 he trialled at the University of Bath and won a place in the Europa Cup Team. Just 4 months later he was selected to compete as a driver in the Europa Cup team. After his first successful season, he made his world cup debut as a driver in 2007. He became the British Champion in 2008. In 2011 John won gold and two bronze medals in the Europa Cup in St Moritz and was the first British man to ever do this.

Thereafter, Jackson had a meteoric rise through the ranks that meant he was given the nod as the main British driver.
Jackson's (now) wife Paula Jackson was also involved in the bobsleigh sport until her retirement from the sport in 2015. She too was recruited while serving in the British Armed Forces, in her instance with the Royal Signals. Paula has admitted several times the huge support that she gets from her family and John Jackson. In June 2014 the couple announced that they were expecting their first child together. Jackson has three daughters from a previous relationship.

In January 2014 Jackson led team-mates Joel Fearon, Stuart Benson and Bruce Tasker to a silver medal in the four-man event at the Bobsleigh European Championship. He competed at the 2010 and 2014 Winter Olympics, guiding his crew to fifth place in the four-man event in 2014, 0.11 seconds off a bronze medal after recovering from a ruptured Achilles tendon. In 2017, the British team were upgraded to the bronze medal position after two Russian crews were disqualified for doping violations. Jackson also competed at seven FIBT World Championships, finishing fifth in the four-man event in the 2013 Worlds at St. Moritz. He took a second place in the four-man competition at the Lake Placid round of the 2013–14 Bobsleigh World Cup, the first podium finish for a British crew for many years. Jackson announced his retirement from the sport in June 2016.

Military service
Jackson joined the Royal Marines in 1996. He is currently a Physical Training Instructor (PTI) and holds the rank of Colour Sergeant.

Achievements
British Champion: 2008

World Championships:
 9th in 2007 (4 man crew)
 13th in 2008 (4 man crew)
 22nd in 2009 (2 man crew)
 17th in 2009 (4 man crew)
 20th in 2011 (2 man crew)
 10th in 2012 (4 man crew)
 19th in 2013 (2 man crew)
 5th in 2013 (4 man crew)

Winter Olympic Games:
3rd in 2014 (4 man crew)

John Jackson also achieved:
 2006 Navy Novice Champion
 2005 Army Novice Champion
 2005 European Novice Push Championships: Bronze Medallist

References

External links
 http://www.royalnavy.mod.uk/royal-marines/corporal-john-jackson/
 http://news.bbc.co.uk/sport1/hi/other_sports/winter_sports/9164897.stm
 http://uk.eurosport.yahoo.com/26022011/58/machata-leads-halfway-stage.html
 http://www.bobteamgb.org/menathletes/a/53/
 http://www.thisiswiltshire.co.uk/sport/8865548.WORLD_CHAMPIONSHIPS__Wiltshire_competitors_help_GB_to_fourth/

1977 births
Bobsledders at the 2010 Winter Olympics
Bobsledders at the 2014 Winter Olympics
British male bobsledders
Living people
Olympic bobsledders of Great Britain
Olympic bronze medallists for Great Britain
Olympic medalists in bobsleigh
Royal Marines ranks
Sportspeople from Bishop Auckland